Dave Mayor (August 21, 1916 – May 27, 2002) was an American weightlifter. He competed in the men's heavyweight event at the 1936 Summer Olympics.

References

External links
 

1916 births
2002 deaths
American male weightlifters
Olympic weightlifters of the United States
Weightlifters at the 1936 Summer Olympics
Sportspeople from Philadelphia
20th-century American people
21st-century American people